Chay Lynn Santini is a Puerto Rican fashion model and actress who in 1998 was named "Latina Super Model of the Year" by Avon Products, Inc.

Early years
Santini was born in San Juan and raised between Puerto Rico and Tampa, Florida.  She moved to Tallahassee, Florida, where she enrolled in the Florida State University. She studied and modeled at the same time for magazines and for companies such as Motorola and Avon. She graduated with a bachelor's degree in studio art, along with taking pre-med classes.

Acting career
In 1998, Santini landed a small and uncredited part as a cheerleader in Adam Sandler's movie The Waterboy.  That experience motivated her to become an actress, and as a result she enrolled and attended the American Academy of Dramatic Arts and The School for Film and Television Acting School.

Also, in 1998, Santini was honored by being named Latina Super Model of the Year by Avon.

She returned to Puerto Rico and on September 21, 2000, she represented San Juan in the Miss World Puerto Rico pageant.  She was chosen as First Runner-Up and won awards for Best Skin, Best Legs, Best Hair, and Best Figure.

Santini was cast as "Alejandra Santiago" in episode 34 ("Family Reunion") in the television series She Spies.  In 2004, Santini played the role of "Diane" in the movie Seeing Other People.

Acting roles
Santini has participated in the following:

Actress
 The Waterboy (1998) (uncredited) - Cougar Cheerleader
 Directing Eddie (2001) (uncredited) - Oliver's Girl
 Nightstalker (2002) - Teenage Girl, "Tina"
 Stunt C*cks (2004) - Alexxxis
 Seeing Other People (2004) - Diane
 Bachelor Party 2: The Last Temptation (2008) - Betty

Miscellaneous crew
 Kiss the Bride (2002) - set costumer
 May (2002) - set costumer
 This Girl's Life (2003) - set costumer

Notable TV guest appearances
 Popular, playing "Salsa Girl" in episode "The Brain Game" (episode # 2.18), April 27, 2001
 The Geena Davis Show, playing "Cheerleader" in episode "White Moms Can't Jump" (episode # 1.21), July 10, 2001
 The Andy Dick Show, playing "Renee" in episode "The Garage Sale" (episode # 3.6), 2002
 She Spies, playing "Alejandra Santiago" in episode "Family Reunion" (episode # 2.14), February 9, 2004

See also

 List of Puerto Ricans
 Corsican immigration to Puerto Rico

References

External links

Lingerie Bowl

20th-century births
Puerto Rican people of Corsican descent
Florida State University alumni
Living people
21st-century Puerto Rican actresses
Puerto Rican female models
People from San Juan, Puerto Rico
Year of birth missing (living people)